Puebla de Sancho Pérez is a municipality in the province of Badajoz, Extremadura, Spain. It has a population of 2,880 and an area of 57 km².

References

Municipalities in the Province of Badajoz